Marian Schwartz is an American translator of contemporary Russian literature. She is the principal English translator of the author Nina Berberova and has translated over 70 books of fiction, history, biography, and criticism into English. She is the recipient of two translation fellowships from the National Endowment for the Arts. Based in Austin, Texas, she is the former president of the American Literary Translators Association.

Biography 
Schwartz was born and raised in Ohio and began studying French as a child. She studied Russian and Spanish at Harvard as an undergraduate before completing a Master's degree in the Slavic Department at the University of Texas at Austin in 1975. During this time, she co-translated her first published translation, An Otherworldly Evening by Marina Tsvetaeva, with Russian professor Richard D. Sylvester. After a year in Austin working on an unpublished translation, she moved to New York to work as an assistant editor for Praeger Publishers on a series of Soviet-focused publications. Another editor at Praeger put Schwartz in touch with a newly started publishing company looking for translators. The book, a translation of the seven-essay collection Vekhi, was published as Landmarks by Karz Howard in 1977.

While perusing the Slavonic Division of the New York Public Library, Schwartz began identifying ignored and overlooked women writers that formed the basis for an anthology of 20th-century women writers, both within the Soviet Union as well as émigrée authors. This work became the foundation for her first fellowship from the NEA and the start of her career as a freelance translator.

Schwartz began publishing translations of Berberova's fiction, beginning with The Accompanist, in 1987. She continued publishing translations of major Russian authors such as Solomon Volkov's Conversations with Joseph Brodsky, Yury Olesha's Envy, Mikhail Bulgakov's The White Guard, and Oblomov by Ivan Goncharov. In 2013, her 2012 translation of Mikhail Shishkin's Maidenhair (Russian: Венерин Волос) was shortlisted for the Best Translated Book Award.

Translation of Anna Karenina 
In 2015, Schwartz published her translation of Anna Karenina (Yale University Press), shortly after Rosamund Bartlett's translation appeared from Oxford University Press. The two translations were often compared in the way they addressed Tolstoy's "rough" language, with Bartlett proposing that Tolstoy was "often a clumsy and occasionally ungrammatical writer, but there is a majesty and elegance to his prose which needs to be emulated in translation wherever possible". However Schwartz's point, as reviewer Masha Gessen described, was that "Tolstoy's writing is indeed remarkable for its purposeful roughness, the use of repetition, and the obsessive breaking of clichés to force the reader to consider the meaning of each word and phrase". In her introduction to the text, Schwartz notes:  English translators have tended to view Tolstoy's sometimes radical choices as 'mistakes' to be corrected, as if Tolstoy, had he known better, or cared more, would not have broken basic rules of literary language.

Selected bibliography

References 

Literary translators
Living people
Harvard University alumni
University of Texas at Austin alumni
20th-century translators
Russian translators
21st-century translators
Year of birth missing (living people)